Österreicher or Oestreicher or  is a German language surname with the literal meaning  "One from Austria", "the Austrian" (German Österreich means "Austria"). 'Oe' is a common rendering of "Ö" whenever the diacritics are not available.

Österreicher 

 Karl Österreicher (1923–1995), Austrian conductor
  (1771–1835), a Bishop of Eichstätt
 John M. Oesterreicher (1904–1993), an Austrian Roman Catholic theologian
 József Manes Österreicher (1756–1831), a Jewish Hungarian physician
 Richard Oesterreicher (born 1932), Austrian musician
 Rudolf Österreicher (1881–1966), Austrian writer

Oestreicher 

 John Oestreicher (1936–2011), American politician and lawyer
 Rachel Oestreicher Bernheim (born 1943), a Jewish American human rights activist
 Robert T. Oestreicher (1894–1955), American businessman and 45th mayor of Columbus, Ohio

See also 
 Österreich (surname)
 Oestreich (surname)
 Ostriker (surname)
 Estereicher (Bosnian Austrians)

German-language surnames